Werner Moring (27 October 1927 – 27 November 1995) was a German cross-country skier. He competed in the men's 30 kilometre event at the 1956 Winter Olympics.

References

External links
 

1927 births
1995 deaths
German male cross-country skiers
Olympic cross-country skiers of the United Team of Germany
Cross-country skiers at the 1956 Winter Olympics
People from Oberharz am Brocken
Sportspeople from Saxony-Anhalt
20th-century German people